Atílio Vivacqua is a Brazilian municipality in the state of Espírito Santo. Its population was 12,105 (2020) and its area is 223 km².

The municipality contains part of the  Serra das Torres Natural Monument, created in 2010 to protect the mountain peaks in the area.

History
Until 10 April 1964, Atílio Vivacqua was a district of Cachoeiro de Itapemirim called Marapé. The municipality is named for Senator Atílio Vivácqua (1894–1961).

Notes

References

Municipalities in Espírito Santo